André Vantomme (born 16 February 1948 in Bondues) is a former member of the Senate of France, who represented the Oise department. He is a member of the Socialist Party.

References
Page on the Senate website 

1948 births
Living people
French Senators of the Fifth Republic
Socialist Party (France) politicians
Senators of Oise
People from Nord (French department)